Kuru fasulye is a stewed bean dish in Turkish cuisine. It is made primarily with white beans and olive oil, and onion and tomato paste or tomato sauce are almost invariably used. Sometimes other vegetables or meat may also be added, especially pastirma. Kuru fasulye is often served along with rice or bulgur. It is often considered the national dish of Turkey.

Its counterpart in Greek cuisine is called fasolada.

See also

 Fasolada
 List of legume dishes

References

External links
 Recipe in English

Turkish stews
Legume dishes